The Eternal Vision is a compilation of music videos and live performances by the band Earth, Wind & Fire. The Eternal Vision was released on November 24, 1992, by Sony Music on VHS.

Track listing
"Serpentine Fire"
"September"
"Boogie Wonderland"
"After The Love Has Gone (Live)"
"Let Me Talk"
"Let's Groove"
"Reasons (Live)"
"Fantasy (Live)"
"System of Survival"
"Thinking of You"
"Evil Roy"
"I Wanna Be The Man"

References

Earth, Wind & Fire video albums
1992 video albums
Music video compilation albums
1992 compilation albums